is the 8th single from Japanese idol group Keyakizaka46. It was released on February 27, 2019, through Sony Music Entertainment Japan. The title track features Yurina Hirate as center.

The single was announced on January 14, 2019. The song was first broadcast on January 21 on Tokyo FM's program "SCHOOL OF LOCK!" and the music video was first released on Keyakizaka46's website on February 1, 2019.

Track listing

Type A

Type B

Type C

Type D

Regular edition

Participating members

"Kuroi Hitsuji" 
Center: Yurina Hirate

 1st row: Yui Kobayashi, Nijika Ishimori, Yurina Hirate, Minami Koike, Shiori Satō
 2nd row: Nana Oda, Yūka Sugai, Risa Watanabe, Akane Moriya, Mizuho Habu
 3rd row: Miyu Suzumoto, Nanako Nagasawa, Rika Ozeki, Neru Nagahama, Rika Watanabe, Rina Uemura, Fuyuka Saitō

“Kimi ni Hanashite Okitai Koto“ 

 Hiragana Keyakizaka46 1st Generation: Mao Iguchi, Sarina Ushio, Memi Kakizaki, Shiho Katō, Kyōko Saitō, Kumi Sasaki, Mirei Sasaki, Mana Takase, Ayaka Takamoto, Mei Higashimura
 Hiragana Keyakizaka46 2nd Generation: Miku Kanemura, Hina Kawata, Nao Kosaka, Suzuka Tomita, Akari Nibu, Hiyori Hamagishi, Konoka Matsuda, Manamo Miyata, Miho Watanabe

"Nobody" 

Kanji Keyakizaka46: Nijika Ishimori, Rina Uemura, Rika Ozeka, Nana Oda, Minami Koike, Yui Kobayashi, Fuyuka Saitō, Shiori Satō, Yūka Sugai, Miyu Suzumoto, Nanako Nagasawa, Neru Nagahama, Mizuho Habu, Yurina Hirate, Akane Moriya, Rika Watanabe, Risa Watanabe

“Dakishimete Yaru“ 

 Hiragana Keyakizaka46 1st Generation: Mao Iguchi, Sarina Ushio, Memi Kakizaki, Shiho Katō, Kyōko Saitō, Kumi Sasaki, Mirei Sasaki, Mana Takase, Ayaka Takamoto, Mei Higashimura
 Hiragana Keyakizaka46 2nd Generation: Miku Kanemura, Hina Kawata, Nao Kosaka, Suzuka Tomita, Akari Nibu, Hiyori Hamagishi, Konoka Matsuda, Manamo Miyata, Miho Watanabe

“Heel no Taka-sa”
 Kanji Keyakizaka46: Yūka Sugai, Akane Moriya

"Gomen ne Christmas" 

Kanji Keyakizaka46: Rina Uemura, Rika Ozeki, Nanako Nagasawa, Rika Watanabe

“Hitei Shita Mirai” 
Kanji Keyakizaka46: Neru Nagahama

Charts

Weekly charts

Year-end charts

References

Further reading

External links 
 Discography on the official website of Keyakizaka46
 "Kuroi Hitsuji" on the official website of Keyakizaka46

2019 singles
Keyakizaka46 songs
2019 songs
Songs with lyrics by Yasushi Akimoto
Sony Music Entertainment Japan singles
Oricon Weekly number-one singles
Billboard Japan Hot 100 number-one singles